Luca Ascani (born 29 June 1983, in Loreto) is an Italian racing cyclist. He was suspended for doping between June 2007 and August 2009.

Palmares
2005
1st stage 7 Tour of Qinghai Lake
2007
1st Giro d'Abruzzo
1st stage 1
2010
1st Tour de Serbie
2011
3rd Giro del Trentino

External links

References

1983 births
Living people
Italian male cyclists
Sportspeople from the Province of Ancona
Cyclists from Marche